Southwest Federal Center is a business district in Southwest Washington, D.C., nearly entirely occupied by offices for various branches of the U.S. Government, including many of the museums of the Smithsonian Institution. 

Southwest Federal Center lies between Independence Avenue and the National Mall to the north, the Southeast-Southwest Freeway (Interstate 395) and the Washington Channel to the south, South Capitol Street to the east, and 15th Street SW to the west.

Several U.S. Cabinet Departments have headquarters or large office complexes in the area, including the Agriculture (including a separate building dedicated to the Forest Service), Transportation, HUD, Health and Human Services, Education, and Energy Departments. The most prominent are the Department of Agriculture, which is housed in a neoclassical building complex that lines both sides of Independence Avenue, and the arcing high-rise of HUD, which is characterized by a unique installation of illuminated fiberglass rings in its 7th Street plaza. Additionally, NASA Headquarters is located in a large building at the corner of 4th and E Streets.  The Bureau of Engraving and Printing is also located in the Southwest Federal Center area.

The office buildings for the U.S. House of Representatives line Independence Avenue on the south side of the U.S. Capitol; two of these, the Rayburn and Ford House Office Buildings, are located in Southwest Federal Center (although the Ford building is not actually located on Independence Avenue, but is on 3rd Street between D Street and Virginia Avenue SW).

The Smithsonian museums in Southwest Federal Center include the Hirshhorn Museum, the National Air and Space Museum, and the Museum of the American Indian, the Freer and Sackler galleries, the National Museum of African Art, and the Arts and Industries Building, as well as the Smithsonian Castle that forms the main offices for the Institution.  The United States Holocaust Memorial Museum, though not affiliated with the Smithsonian, is also located in the vicinity.

The few non-governmental businesses in the neighborhood include five hotels, St. Dominic's Catholic Church, a few restaurants, a power station for the neighborhood, the First District police station, and commercial spaces (e.g., convenience stores, bank branches, coffee shops, etc.) in the lobbies of the hotels and office buildings. Also, L'Enfant Plaza, a multi-building complex and promenade that includes both government and civilian offices (as well as an indoor shopping mall), is located off Independence Avenue.

The Southwest Federal Center is served by the Smithsonian and Federal Center SW Metro stations on the Orange, Blue, Silver Lines, and by the L'Enfant Plaza station on the Green, Yellow, Silver, Orange, and Blue Lines.